The 1999 Singaporean presidential election was held to elect the next president of Singapore. S. R. Nathan was elected in an uncontested election due to lack of eligible candidates. He was the only candidate that was granted an eligibility certificate to contest in the 1999 presidential election.

Candidates
The Presidential Elections Committee declared S. R. Nathan (formerly known as Sellapan Ramanathan) to be the only eligible presidential candidate to be issued a Certificate of Eligibility. Nathan was successfully nominated on 18 August and was inaugurated as the sixth President of Singapore on 1 September 1999.

Eligible

Declared ineligible

External links
 Presidential Elections Results, Singapore Election Department
 Singaporean presidential election of 1999, Singapore-Elections.com

1999
1999 elections in Asia
Presidential election
Uncontested elections